Chris Aitken (born 26 October 1948) is a former Australian rules footballer who played with Melbourne in the Victorian Football League (VFL).

Biography
His is the older brother of Melbourne musician and radio host, Wilbur Wilde.  In the 2001 Australian federal election, he was the Australian Greens candidate in the Division of Gippsland, polling 5.55% of the vote.

He also played cricket, representing Victoria Country in two tour games.  In 1978 he took four wickets in a match against an England XI at Leongatha and in 1980 played against touring New Zealanders.

Notes

External links 

1948 births
Living people
Australian rules footballers from Victoria (Australia)
Melbourne Football Club players
Australian Greens candidates